Ion Madan is a Moldovan politician, who served as member of the Parliament of Moldova (1990 — 1994).

Ion Madan is one of the 278 signatories of the Declaration of Independence of the Republic of Moldova signed on 27 August 1991. 

At the time of electing as a deputy, he was working as chief energetician at the "Moldsviazistroi" Trust in Durlești, the suburb of Chișinău. He was elected from the Chişinău constituency.

He is a member of the "National Council of the Union 1991",  member of the Council and deputy chairman of the "Parliament - 90" Public Association of the Republic of Moldova.

Awards and honours 
 The "Meritul Civic" medal (1996)
 Order of the Republic Moldova (2012)

References

External links 
 Cine au fost şi ce fac deputaţii primului Parlament din R. Moldova (1990-1994)?
 Declaraţia deputaţilor din primul Parlament
 Site-ul Parlamentului Republicii Moldova

Living people
Moldovan MPs 1990–1994
Popular Front of Moldova MPs
Year of birth missing (living people)